Gino Rossetti (7 November 1904 – 15 May 1992) was an Italian football manager and former footballer who played as a forward. He jointly holds the record for the all-time most goals scored in a single Italian league season at 36 goals with Torino during the 1928–29 season. He competed in the 1928 Summer Olympics with the Italy national football team, where he won a bronze medal, and was top scorer in the 1927-30 edition of the Central European International Cup, where he won a gold medal.

Club career

Spezia
Rossetti began his career as a left-winger, and debuted at the age of fifteen in the 1919–20 championship with Virtus Spezia. After one more season he went to play with Spezia, who played in Division II. On the penultimate day of the 1923–24 season he was involved in a home game against Torino decided by his goal: the game was suspended several times by the referee for problems created by the public. The Piedmontese presented a complaint that was accepted, giving the team the victory in the table and subsequent victory of the group only after the national finals, played without Torino who were considered eliminated in the meantime.

Torino
Rossetti later transferred to Torino, and contributed to the conquest of their first league title in 1926–27 (later revoked) and in 1927–28, scoring 19 goals (17 in group B and 2 in the final group) in the first season, and 23 (14 in group A and 9 in the final round) in the second. With Adolfo Baloncieri and Julio Libonatti he formed "the trio of wonders", Torino's prolific attack during the 1920s.

In the 1928–29 season, he lost a final against Bologna, with the team scoring 117 goals in 33 games (115 in the 30 matches of the first phase and 2 in the 3 final races for the award of the title). Rossetti closed the championship by scoring 36 goals in 30 games, setting the record of all-time most goals scored in a single Italian league season, later matched by Argentine Gonzalo Higuaín in the Serie A 2015–16 season.

He remained in Turin until 1933, playing 212 league games and scoring 134 goals.

International career

He was a member of the Italian team which won the bronze medal in the 1928 Summer Olympic football tournament.
And he was top scorer, when Italy won the 1927-30 Central European International Cup.

Personal life
His brother, Giuseppe, was also a footballer, who was known as "Rossetti I", while Gino was known as "Rossetti II".

Honours

Club

Torino
Italian Football Championship: 1927–28

International
Italy
 Central European International Cup: 1927-30
 Summer Olympics: Bronze 1928

Individual

Divisione Nazionale – Top scorer: 1928–29 (36 goals)
Central European International Cup top scorer: 1927–30 (6 goals)

References

External links
 

1904 births
1992 deaths
People from La Spezia
Italian footballers
Footballers at the 1928 Summer Olympics
Olympic footballers of Italy
Olympic bronze medalists for Italy
Italy international footballers
Olympic medalists in football
Medalists at the 1928 Summer Olympics
Association football forwards
Serie A players
Serie B players
Serie C players
Spezia Calcio players
Torino F.C. players
S.S.C. Napoli players
S.S. Maceratese 1922 players
Footballers from Liguria
Sportspeople from the Province of La Spezia